Santi Martiri dell'Uganda a Poggio Ameno is a 20th-century parochial church and titular church in Rome, dedicated to the Uganda Martyrs.

History 

The church was built in 1973–1980. Its roof is curved like a Ugandan hut.

On 28 June 1988, it was made a titular church to be held by a cardinal-priest.

Titulars
 Christian Tumi (1988–2021)
 Peter Okpaleke (2022–present)

References

Titular churches
Rome Q. XX Ardeatino
Roman Catholic churches completed in 1980
20th-century Roman Catholic church buildings in Italy